Robert Townson High School is a government-funded co-educational comprehensive secondary day school, located on Thunderbolt Drive in , a south-western suburb of Sydney, New South Wales, Australia.  

The school is operated by the NSW Department of Education; the principal is Warren Parkes.

History 

Both the High School and adjacent Primary School take their name from Robert Townson, an English scholar and scientist who settled in Colonial New South Wales and was a local farmer and land owner.

Learning facilities 
Robert Townson High School is made up of 12 blocks, including portables:
 A block is the Home Economics block, where cooking, textiles, and child studies takes place
 B block is the Administration office
 C block is the Visual Arts block, where Visual Arts, Photography, Visual Design, Year 7 and 8 general art is studied and where the TSO office is
 D block is where the PD/H/PE staff room is situated. This block also holds a computer room that the senior IT classes learn in, it is also used by other classes
 E block is the Industrial Arts block, where Metalwork, Woodwork, Engineering, Electronics, and Building And Construction is held
 F block is the Canteen
 G block is the Music block
 H block is the Science block, where Years 7 - 10 take General Science and Years 11 and 12 can take (if they choose to) Physics, Chemistry, Biology, Senior Science, and until recently, Marine Studies takes place
 I block is the grounds keeping shead/s  and out of bounds to all students
 J block is the Mathematics block, where Mathematics takes place, and its rooms are also substituted for other subjects as well. It used to hold a computer room now a digital connected classroom
 K block is the Library
 L block is the English block where History(General, Modern, Ancient), Language (being German at the moment), English, Geography, Business Studies, Legal Studies and sometimes Economics are explored. It also holds a computer room
 P block is the portable class rooms, and the HIU Department

Dress code 

Robert Townson High School has a fairly strict dress code which must be adhered to.

Junior students:
Girls: white shirt, grey pants or maroon skirt.
Boys: white shirt, grey or maroon pants or shorts.
Senior students:
Girls: yellow shirt, girls tie, grey pants or dark maroon skirt.
Boys: yellow shirt, boys tie, grey pants or shorts.

All students must wear predominantly black shoes which must be enclosed. On sports days (Mondays) students in years 7-10 are permitted to wear the school joggers any other form of track pants are not permitted.
Sport uniform is a maroon, grey and white shirt and maroon pants.

Charity 

Robert Townson High is known for its ongoing volunteer work in the community. Its students participate in events and activities such as Clean Up Australia Day, The Mount Annan Challenge Walk and Australian Red Cross Blood Service donations.

See also 

 List of government schools in New South Wales
 Education in Australia

References

External links 
 

Public high schools in New South Wales
Educational institutions established in 1987
1987 establishments in Australia
South Western Sydney